Loxosceles blanda, the Big Bend recluse, is a species of recluse spider in the family Sicariidae. It is found in the United States.

References

Sicariidae
Articles created by Qbugbot
Spiders described in 1983